Bradley Danger (born 29 January 1998) is a French professional footballer who plays for Rodez as a defender.

Professional career
Danger is a youth product of Le Havre AC, and signed a professional contract with them in June 2018 before joining Avranches on loan. He then signed with Avranches, and after a successful season joined FC Chambly on 16 May 2020. Danger made his professional debut with Chambly in a 3-0 Ligue 2 loss to Paris FC on 22 August 2020.

On 16 June 2021 he joined Rodez.

International career
Danger is a youth international for France, and represented the France U17s at the 2015 UEFA European Under-17 Championship.

References

External links

 
 

1998 births
Living people
People from Mont-Saint-Aignan
French footballers
France youth international footballers
Association football midfielders
FC Chambly Oise players
US Avranches players
Rodez AF players
Ligue 2 players
Championnat National players
Championnat National 2 players
Championnat National 3 players
Footballers from Normandy
Sportspeople from Seine-Maritime